The  is a skyscraper located in Shinjuku, Tokyo, Japan. Construction of the 184-metre, 38-storey skyscraper was finished in 2002.

References

External links

  

Skyscrapers in Shinjuku
2002 establishments in Japan
Skyscraper office buildings in Tokyo
Office buildings completed in 2002